Haipou Jadonang Kambiron railway station is a proposed railway station in Tamenglong district, Manipur. Its code is KMBRN. It will serve Kambiron village. The station was renamed in honour of Haipou Jadonang, a freedom fighter of India and the founder of the Zeliangrong movement, in 2014. The work on this rail line is expected to be finished year 2019.

References

Railway stations in Imphal East district
Lumding railway division
Proposed railway stations in India